Teresa Rivera Pastrana (born April 24, 1966) is a former female backstroke and freestyle swimmer from Mexico. She participated in two consecutive Summer Olympics for her native country, starting in 1980. Her best result was a 6th place in the Women's 4 × 100 m Freestyle Relay at the 1980 Summer Olympics in Moscow, Soviet Union. She won three bronze medals at the Panamerican games in 1979.
She later retired from swimming and became a teacher teaching Health 101 to Freshmen at the American School Foundation of Mexico City.  Also, she is the head of the swimming department swimming at ASF.

References
Profile

External links

1966 births
Living people
Mexican female swimmers
Mexican female freestyle swimmers
Female backstroke swimmers
Swimmers at the 1979 Pan American Games
Swimmers at the 1980 Summer Olympics
Swimmers at the 1983 Pan American Games
Swimmers at the 1984 Summer Olympics
Swimmers at the 1987 Pan American Games
Olympic swimmers of Mexico
Place of birth missing (living people)
Pan American Games bronze medalists for Mexico
Pan American Games medalists in swimming
Central American and Caribbean Games gold medalists for Mexico
Central American and Caribbean Games medalists in swimming
Competitors at the 1978 Central American and Caribbean Games
Competitors at the 1982 Central American and Caribbean Games
Medalists at the 1979 Pan American Games
Medalists at the 1983 Pan American Games
20th-century Mexican women
21st-century Mexican women